These are the official results of the Men's 800 metres event at the 1999 IAAF World Championships in Seville, Spain. There were a total number of 59 participating athletes, with eight qualifying heats, three semi-finals and the final held on Sunday 29 August 1999 at 20:30h.

Medalists

Heats
Held on Thursday 26 August 1999

Semi-final
Held on Friday 27 August 1999

Final

References
 IAAF
 todor66

H
800 metres at the World Athletics Championships